Marrying Millions is an American reality television series that premiered on Lifetime on July 10, 2019. The show follows the everyday lives of six couples who face scrutiny from friends and family.

On October 2, 2019, the series was renewed for a second season which began on August 5, 2020. This season continued to follow one couple from Season 1 and introduced 5 new couples.

Cast
Marrying Millions included the following couples:

Sean Lourdes and Megan Thomas Lourdes 
Megan is a yoga instructor, a model signed with Elite, graduate of UCLA, and fiancé of Sean with whom she has a three-year-old son. Sean is the grandson of AUGE Media Publishing founder, Don Julio Lourdes. While most of their wedding planning goes smoothly, the couple face pressure from Sean's father, Emilio, to get a prenup. The season ends with the pair marrying at Cypress Sea Cove in Malibu, without a prenup.

Shawn Isaac and Kate London 
Shawn, 29, is a rapper and entrepreneur from Palm Springs. While Kate, 33, has wedding bells on her mind, she begins to question if everything is what it seems. In their final episode, Shawn gives Katie a "diamond" bracelet that turns out to be Cubic Zirconia.  The couple previously appeared on a Facebook reality show Make Up or Break up in 2017. Isaac has also been on MTV's True Life, Startup U, Bravo's Million Dollar Matchmaker (Season 2, Episode 6).

Gentille Chhun and Brian Blu (also known as Dave Smith) 
Gentille is a real estate investor in Las Vegas who has been dating Brian, an actor and construction worker who her friends think is using her. During the season, the couple get engaged, but ultimately break-up on the day of their wedding. After the season aired, the legitimacy of their wedding day came into question after reports came out that alleged that there was no public record of a registered marriage license under either of their names in Clark County, Nevada (which would have been required if they were marrying that day).

Drew Gemma and Rosie Marin 
40 year old Drew owns a construction and landscaping company and likes to spoil his college graduate girlfriend Rosie, whom he met on SugarDaddy.com. During the season, the couple got engaged. In the season finale, the couple elope to Costa Rica. It is unclear if they are legally married in the U.S. Rosie coined the phrase "Come Through Daddy Drew." After the show aired, Drew's financing allegedly came into question after tax liens and Uniform Commercial Code (UCC) filings became public.

Bill Hutchinson and Brianna Ramirez 
Briana, 21, had been dating Bill, the 60-year-old president of Dallas-based Dunhill Partners Inc, for one year. Bill's ex-wife is also on the show to "stir the pot." After two years, the couple are still together. In July 2021, Bill would be criminally charged with sexually abusing three underage girls at his vacation home in Laguna Beach, California.

Katie Hamilton and Kolton Pierce 
Katie, 37, has been dating her daughter's friend Kolton, 23. Katie was previously married to baseball player Josh Hamilton. The current status of their relationship is unknown.

Couples

Episodes

Season 1

Season 2

References

External links
Official website

2010s American reality television series
2019 American television series debuts
Lifetime (TV network) original programming
2020s American reality television series